SM UA was a U-boat of the Imperial German Navy during World War I. Built as the fifth submarine of the Norwegian A class the boat was launched 9 May 1914 and confiscated by the German government after the outbreak of World War I on 5 August 1914. Commissioned as SM U 0 on 14 August 1914 the boat was renamed UA two weeks later and assigned to coastal protection. In 1916 UA was transferred to the Uschule (Submarine School).

UA was surrendered to the Allies at Harwich on 24 November 1918 in accordance with the requirements of the Armistice with Germany. She was lost on tow off Folkestone in April 1919 while being transferred from Harwich to a French port. The wreck was identified by archaeologist Innes McCartney in 2013.

References

Notes

Citations

Norwegian A-class submarines
U-boats commissioned in 1914
World War I submarines of Germany
1914 ships
Ships built in Kiel